is a Japanese singer and screenwriter. She has released 17 singles and 11 albums since her debut in 1994. Several of her songs have been used as openings and endings of anime and radio dramas.

Discography

Albums
KI ･ RA ･ RI PI ･ KA ･ RI (May 3, 1995)
All Weather Girl (December 16, 1995)
ドラムカンサラダ (December 17, 1997)
ベリー☆ロール (August 21, 1998)
真空パック〜シングル・コレクション〜 (March 20, 1999)
23.4 (July 23, 1999)
最高最強のうそつきになってやる。 (August 23, 2000)
Baby Leaf (September 21, 2001)
10歳 (October 8, 2003)
2930〜にくみそ〜 (December 19, 2007)
20歳 (August 27, 2014) ("best of")

Singles
"瞳にDiamond" (June 22, 1994) Ending of Haō Taikei Ryū Knight anime television series
"Run -今日が変わるMagic-" (October 21, 1994)
"未知への扉" (December 16, 1994) Opening of 聖刻覇伝 ラシュオーンの嵐 radio drama
"Wonderful Bravo!" (May 24, 1995) Opening of ゴクドーくん漫遊記外伝2 JAJA姫武遊伝 radio drama
"はじまりの冒険者たち" (July 21, 1995) Ending of Legend of Crystania anime film
"Dollたちの独立記念日" (October 21, 1995) Opening of Haō Taikei Ryū Knight radio drama
"Future" (November 21, 1996) Opening of 魔神英雄伝ワタル外伝 ピュア ピュア ヒミコ radio drama
"風のシンフォニー" (June 4, 1997)
"ひとつのハートで" (November 6, 1997) Opening of Cho Mashin Hero Wataru anime
"BOYS BE AMBITIOUS" (November 6, 1997) Ending of Cho Mashin Hero Wataru anime
"POWER OF DREAM" (April 22, 1998) Opening of Cho Mashin Hero Wataru anime
"がんばって" (April 22, 1998) Ending of Cho Mashin Hero Wataru anime
"瞳 Fall in Love" (July 23, 1998)
"ガリレオの夜" (May 21, 1999) Theme song of 瞳と光央の爆発ラジオ
"ゆっくり" (April 21, 2001) Ending of UFO Baby anime
"Dearest" (July 25, 2001) Opening of I My Me! Strawberry Eggs anime
"瞳でEle-phant!" (August 27, 2014)

Other songs
W – Infinity Opening of Gear Fighter Dendoh anime
風の翼 Opening of Haō Taikei Ryū Knight: Adeu's Legend original video animation

Screenwriting credits
• all credits are under the name of Deko Akao unless otherwise noted• head writer credits are denoted in bold

Television
 Lime-iro Ryukitan X (2005)
 Akahori Gedou Hour Rabuge (2005)
 Happy Seven (2005)
 Lemon Angel Project (2006)
 Yes! PreCure 5 (2007)
 Fantastic Detective Labyrinth (2007–2008)
 Yes! PreCure 5 GoGo! (2008)
 Hell Girl: Three Vessels (2008): as Hitomi Mieno
 Natsu no Arashi! (2009)
 Asura Cryin' (2009): season 2 head writer
 Yatterman (2009)
 Fresh Pretty Cure! (2009–2010)
 Gokujo!! Mecha Mote Iincho (2009–2011)
 Arakawa Under the Bridge (2010)
 Arakawa Under the Bridge x Bridge (2010)
 Bakugan Battle Brawlers: New Vestroia (2011)
 Bakugan: Gundalian Invaders (2011)
 Astarotte’s Toy (2011)
 Abnormal Physiology Seminar (2011)
 Pretty Rhythm: Aurora Dream (2011–2012)
 Bakugan: Mechtanium Surge (2011–2012)
 Mysterious Girlfriend X (2012)
 My Little Monster (2012)
 Pretty Rhythm: Dear My Future (2012–2013)
 Pretty Rhythm: Rainbow Live
 BlazBlue Alter Memory (2013)
 Meganebu! (2013)
 Meshimase Lodoss-to Senki: Sorette Oishii no? (2014)
 Noragami (2014)
 Turning Mecard (2015)
 Etotama (2015)
 Noragami Aragoto (2015)
 Gintama Season 3 (2015–2016)
 Omakase! Miracle Cat-dan (2015–2016)
 Snow White with the Red Hair (2015–2016)
 Kamisama Minarai: Himitsu no Cocotama (2015–2018)
 Flying Witch (2016)
 Age 12 (2016)
 B-Project ~Kodo*Ambitious~ (2016)
 First Love Monster (2016)
 Amanchu! (2016)
 3-Nen D-Gumi Glass no Kamen (2016)
 Urara Meirocho (2017)
 Frame Arms Girl (2017)
 Anonymous Noise (2017)
 PriPri Chi-chan!! (2017)
 Hitorijime My Hero (2017)
 Snack World (2017–2018)
 Amanchu! Advance (2018)
 How to Keep a Mummy (2018)
 After the Rain (2018)
 Rokuhōdō Yotsuiro Biyori (2018)
 Ongaku Shōjo (2018)
 Merc Storia: The Apathetic Boy and the Girl in a Bottle (2018)
 Real Girl (2018–2019)
 Layton Mystery Tanteisha: Katori no Nazotoki File (2018–2019)
 Zoids Wild (2018–2019)
 Kira Kira Happy Hirake! Cocotama (2018–2019)
 My Roommate Is a Cat (2019)
 Carole & Tuesday (2019)
 Inazuma Eleven: Orion no Kokuin (2019)
 Do You Love Your Mom and Her Two-Hit Multi-Target Attacks? (2019)
 High School Prodigies Have It Easy Even In Another World (2019)
 Assassins Pride (2019)
 Pokémon Journeys: The Series (2019–2020)
 If My Favorite Pop Idol Made It to the Budokan, I Would Die (2020)
 Shadowverse (2020–2021)
 Yo-kai Watch Jam - Yo-kai Academy Y: Close Encounters of the N Kind (2020–2021)
 Pokémon Master Journeys: The Series (2020–2021)
 Pokémon Ultimate Journeys: The Series (2021–2022)
 Suppose a Kid from the Last Dungeon Boonies Moved to a Starter Town (2021)
 Higehiro (2021)
 The Detective Is Already Dead (2021)
 The Dungeon of Black Company (2021)
 Komi Can%27t Communicate (2021–2022)
 The Case Study of Vanitas (2021–2022)
 The Genius Prince%27s Guide to Raising a Nation Out of Debt (2022)
 Shadowverse Flame (2022-present)
 Miss Shachiku and the Little Baby Ghost (2022)
 My Stepmom's Daughter Is My Ex (2022)
 When Will Ayumu Make His Move? (2022)
 In Another World with My Smartphone 2nd Season (2023)
 The Most Heretical Last Boss Queen (2023)
 Kizuna no Allele (2023)
 Ragna Crimson (2023)
 Tearmoon Empire (2023)
 Unnamed Memory (2023)
 Doctor Elise: The Royal Lady with the Lamp (TBA)

Films
 Fly Out, Pripara: Aim for it with Everyone! Idol Grand Prix (2015)
 Frame Arms Girl: Kyakkyau Fufu na Wonderland (2019)

References

External links
Blog 

@wiki 

1977 births
Anime singers
Anime screenwriters
Japanese women screenwriters
Living people
Musicians from Fukuoka Prefecture
21st-century Japanese singers
21st-century Japanese women singers